The Associação dos Escuteiros de Cabo Verde, the national Scouting organization of Cape Verde, was founded in 1990, and became a member of the World Organization of the Scout Movement in 2002. The Associação dos Escuteiros de Cabo Verde has 733 members as of 2004.

The association is a member of the Comunidade do Escutismo Lusófono (Community of Lusophone Scouting).

Program and ideals
O escuta orgulha-se da sua Fé e por ela orienta toda a sua vida. 
O Escuta é filho de Cabo Verde e bom cidadão. 
O dever do Escuta começa em casa. 

The Scout Motto is Alerta, Alert in Portuguese.

Officers
Chief Commissioner: Luis Miguel Delgado
International Commissioner: Anne Marie Monteiro

External links
Non-official website

Organizations based in Cape Verde
World Organization of the Scout Movement member organizations
Youth organizations established in 1990